The 2020 Lanka Premier League Final was a Twenty20 cricket match played on 16 December 2020 at the Mahinda Rajapaksa International Cricket Stadium, Hambantota, Sri Lanka between Galle Gladiators and Jaffna Stallions to ascertain the winner of 2020 Lanka Premier League. Jaffna Stallions won the match against Galle Gladiators by 53 runs to be the Champions of inaugural LPL.

Route to the final
 

During the group stage of the 2020 Lanka Premier League each team played eight matches, two against each of the other sides contesting the competition. The top four teams progressed to the playoff stage. Galle Gladiators concluded the league stage in fourth position with 4 points by winning two of their matches, losing six. Jaffna Stallions finished the league stage in third position with 9 points by winning four and losing three of their matches.

Galle Gladiators reached the final after defeating Colombo Kings by two wickets in the first semifinal. Jaffna Stallions qualified for the final after trouncing 
Dambulla Viiking by 37 runs in the second semifinal.

League stage matches

Playoff matches

Semifinal 1

Semifinal 2

Scorecard

Keys:
 (C) indicates team captain
  indicates Wicket-keeper
On-field umpires: Kumar Dharmasena and Ruchira Palliyaguruge
Third umpire: Lyndon Hannibal
Reserve umpire: Raveendra Wimalasiri
Match referee: Ranjan Madugalle

Toss: Jaffna Stallions won the toss and elected to bat.

Result: Jaffna Stallions won by 53 runs

|colspan="4"| Extras 5 (wd 5) Total 188/6 (20 overs)
|19
|7
|9.40 RR

Fall of wickets: 1-44 (Johnson Charles, 4.4 ov), 2-66 (Charith Asalanka, 7.2 ov), 3-70 (Avishka Fernando, 8.4 ov), 4-139 (Dhananjaya de Silva, 15.5 ov), 5-159 (Shoaib Malik, 17.5 ov), 6-175 (Wanindu Hasaranga, 18.6 ov)

Target: 189 runs from 20 overs at 9.45 RR

|colspan="4"| Extras 2 (nb 1, wd 1) Total 135/9 (20 overs)
|9
|9
|9.40 RR

Fall of wickets: 1-1 (Hazratullah Zazai, 0.3 ov), 2-3 (Danushka Gunathilaka, 1.2 ov), 3-7 (Ahsan Ali, 1.4 ov), 4-62 (Bhanuka Rajapaksa, 8.2 ov), 5-76 (Shehan Jayasuriya, 9.5 ov), 6-93 (Dhananjaya Lakshan, 11.6 ov), 7-110 (Azam Khan, 13.5 ov), 8-114 (Mohammad Amir, 14.1 ov), 9-130 (Sahan Arachchige, 17.3 ov)

See also
 Lanka Premier League
 2020 Lanka Premier League

References

2020 in Sri Lankan cricket
2020 Lanka Premier League